Martín Alejo Conde (born 25 August 1971 in Mar del Plata) is a beach volleyball player from Argentina, who won the world title at the 2001 Beach Volleyball World Championships in Klagenfurt, Austria, partnering Mariano Baracetti. He represented his native country at four consecutive Summer Olympics, starting in 1996 (Atlanta, Georgia).

References
 Martín Conde at the Beach Volleyball Database

1971 births
Living people
Argentine beach volleyball players
Men's beach volleyball players
Beach volleyball players at the 1996 Summer Olympics
Beach volleyball players at the 2000 Summer Olympics
Beach volleyball players at the 2004 Summer Olympics
Beach volleyball players at the 2008 Summer Olympics
Olympic beach volleyball players of Argentina
Sportspeople from Mar del Plata
Beach volleyball defenders